Ferme was a  74-gun ship of the line of the French Navy. Offered to the Crown by the Ferme générale as a Don des vaisseaux, she was renamed Phocion at the Revolution . Her officers surrendered her to Spain in 1793 out of Royalist political convictions and she served in the Spanish Navy until 1818.

Career 
Built under supervision of engineer de la Motte, Ferme entered active service on 28 January 1786. In September 1790, she was sent to the Caribbean, where she recaptured the naval schooner Bigotte on 10 November 1791. The next week, she recaptured Îlet Ramiers, whose garrison had rebelled.

On 3 October 1792, she was renamed Phocion, but before the decree arrived, her officers had mutined against the First French Republic and were flying the Royalist white ensign. On 11 January 1793, they sailed her into Trinidad to surrender her to Spain.

Ferme was incorporated into the Spanish Navy, where she served until 1808.

Notes, citations, and references
Notes

Citations

References

Ships of the line of the French Navy
Téméraire-class ships of the line
1785 ships